Charlie Jones (born October 29, 1998) is an American football wide receiver for Purdue University. He previously played college football for the University at Buffalo and the University of Iowa. In 2022, he was named as an All-American.

Early life and high school
Jones grew up in Deerfield, Illinois and attended Deerfield High School. He committed to play college football at Buffalo over offers from Ball State, Bowling Green, North Dakota State, Northern Illinois, Western Michigan, and Wyoming.

College career

Buffalo 
Jones began his collegiate career at Buffalo. He redshirted his true freshman season. As a redshirt freshman, Jones caught 18 passes for 395 yards and three touchdowns and returned 15 kickoffs for 289 yards. After the season, he transferred to Iowa.

Iowa 
Jones joined the Iowa Hawkeyes as a walk-on and sat out his first season at Iowa due to NCAA transfer rules. He entered his first season at Iowa as the team's primary punt returner. Jones finished the 2020 season with 21 punt returns for 221 yards and one touchdown and was named second team All-Big Ten Conference as a returner by the league's coaches. He was also awarded a scholarship during the season. As a redshirt senior, Jones was named first team All-Big Ten and the Rodgers-Dwight Return Specialist of the Year after he returned 37 punts for 285 yards and also returned 25 kickoffs for 635 yards and one touchdown. He was also a starter at receiver for the Hawkeyes and had 21 receptions for 323 yards and three touchdowns. After the season, Jones entered the NCAA transfer portal.

Purdue 
Jones ultimately transferred to Purdue for his final season of eligibility. At Purdue, Jones caught 110 passes for a school-record 1,361 yards. Following the 2022 Big Ten Championship Game, Jones decided to forgo participation in the 2023 Citrus Bowl and prepare for the 2023 NFL Draft.

Statistics

References

External links
Buffalo Bulls bio
Iowa Hawkeyes bio
Purdue Boilermakers bio

Living people
Players of American football from Illinois
American football wide receivers
Buffalo Bulls football players
Purdue Boilermakers football players
Iowa Hawkeyes football players
People from Deerfield, Illinois
American football return specialists
Sportspeople from the Chicago metropolitan area
1998 births